is a Japanese manga artist.

She is primarily known for her shōjo manga works in the magazines LaLa and LaLa DX, published by Hakusensha.

Her most successful works have been Hotarubi no Mori e, which received a film adaptation in 2011 and Natsume's Book of Friends, which has been made into an anime series that aired for six seasons (2008–2017). The manga has sold over 5 million copies by the release of its 12th volume.

Awards
In 1998, she won the 18th "LMG Fresh Debut" award for her debut work Coffee Hirari.
In 2000, she won an award by Hakusensha (白泉社アテナ新人大賞デビュー優秀者賞) for Akaku Saku Koe.

Manga works
  [November 1998], LaLa DX
 	[1998–2000], LaLa, LaLa DX, 3 volumes total
  [2001], LaLa, 3 episodes, no volume publication
  [2001], LaLa DX, also published as a tanpenshū of the same name
  [July 2002], LaLa DX, also published as a tanpenshū of the same name
  [November 2002], LaLa DX, also published as a tanpenshū Hotarubi no Mori e
  [January 2003], LaLa, also published as a tanpenshū Hotarubi no Mori e
  [April 2003], LaLa, also published as a tanpenshū Hotarubi no Mori e
  [2003], also published as a tanpenshū 
  [2002–2004], LaLa DX, 3 volumes total
  [2005], also published as a tanpenshū Hotarubi no Mori e Tokubetsuhen
  [2003, 2005–2018], LaLa DX
  included in September 2000 issue of LaLa and Natsume Yūjinchō Volume 7
  [September 2011], published in the tanpenshū Hotarubi no Mori e Tokubetsuhen

Other media
In 2011, Hotarubi no Mori e was adapted into an anime film. Natsume's Book of Friends  was adapted into an anime television series that ran for six seasons over nine years (2008–2017). A series of original video animation episodes were released simultaneously. A theatrical anime film, Natsume's Book of Friends the Movie: Tied to the Temporal World, was released in 2018. A second theatrical anime film, "Natsume's Book of Friends: The Waking Rock and the Strange Visitor", was released January 16, 2021.

References

1976 births
Living people
Manga artists from Kumamoto Prefecture